Stretchia inferior is a species of cutworm or dart moth in the family Noctuidae. It is found in North America.

The MONA or Hodges number for Stretchia inferior is 10475.

References

Further reading

 
 
 

Orthosiini
Articles created by Qbugbot
Moths described in 1888